Events from the year 1718 in Russia

Incumbents
 Monarch – Peter I

Events

 12 April - The Neva Yacht Club is founded
 12 December - The Admiralty Board is established

Births
20 August - Natalia Petrovna, grand duchess, daughter of Peter I (d. 1725)
 18 September - Nikita Ivanovich Panin, statesman (d. 1783)
 17 November - Alexander Mikhailovich Golitsyn, prince, field-marshal, Governor of St. Petersburg (d. 1783)
 18 December - Anna Leopoldovna, briefly regent of Russia (d. 1746)

Deaths
 1 May - Tsarevna Catherine Alekseyevna of Russia (b. 1658)
 26 June - Alexei Petrovich, Tsarevich of Russia (b. 1690)
Date unknown
 Andrey Khilkov, ambassador to Sweden (b. 1767)
 Alexander Kikin, adviser to Tsarevich Alexei (b. c. 1670)

References

 
Years of the 18th century in Russia